Martin Hebík (born 11 November 1982, in České Budějovice) is a Czech cyclist, who last rode for Czech amateur team .

Major results
2004
7th Sparkassen Giro
2005
5th GP Jamp
2006
10th Tour du Jura
2007
2nd Rund um Düren
10th Rund um die Nürnberger Altstadt
2008
1st Overall Tour of Szeklerland
1st Prologue & Stage 2
2nd Road race, National Road Championships
2010
1st Prologue Dookoła Mazowsza
9th Overall Czech Cycling Tour

References

External links

1982 births
Living people
Czech male cyclists
Sportspeople from České Budějovice